The 1966–67 season was the 11th season of the Liga Nacional de Baloncesto. Juventud de Badalona won its first league title ever.

Teams and venues

League table

Relegation playoffs

|}

Stats Leaders

Points

References

ACB.com 
Linguasport 

Liga Española de Baloncesto (1957–1983) seasons